{{DISPLAYTITLE:Mu1 Cancri}}

Mu1 Cancri, Latinised from μ1 Cancri, is a variable star in the zodiac constellation of Cancer. The name Mu1 comes from the Bayer naming system: the "1" in the name is because (from Earth) it appears to be close to 10 Cancri, or Mu2 Cancri. It is also known by the variable star designation BL Cancri. The star is dimly visible to the naked eye with an apparent visual magnitude that ranges from 5.87 down to 6.07. At that distance, the visual magnitude is diminished by an extinction factor of 0.28. The position of the star near the ecliptic means it is subject to lunar occultations.

The star Mu1 Cancri is an evolved red giant currently on the asymptotic giant branch with a stellar classification of M3 III. The lack of technetium-99 in the spectrum indicates it has not yet gone through third dredge-up. It is a slow irregular variable with thermal pulsation periods of 22.6, 37.8 and 203.7 days.

References

M-type giants
Slow irregular variables
Asymptotic-giant-branch stars

Cancer (constellation)
Cancri, Mu1
Durchmusterung objects
Cancri, 09
066875
039659
3169
Cancri, BL